Daniel Florencio Sánchez Núñez (born May 3, 1961 in Montevideo), best known as 
Daniel Sánchez, is a retired football (soccer) defender and current manager who was nicknamed "Pecho" during his professional career. Having made his debut on September 27, 1988 against Ecuador (2-1), Sánchez obtained a total number of 25 international caps for the Uruguay national football team.

References
  Profile

1961 births
Living people
Footballers from Montevideo
Uruguayan footballers
Association football defenders
Club Atlético River Plate (Montevideo) players
Liverpool F.C. (Montevideo) players
Rampla Juniors players
Central Español players
Danubio F.C. players
Peñarol players
Uruguayan Primera División players
Uruguay international footballers
1991 Copa América players
1993 Copa América players
Uruguayan football managers
Danubio F.C. managers
Uruguayan Primera División managers